Johnathan Aparecido da Silva (born 29 March 1990), commonly known as Johnathan Goaiano or just Johnathan, is a Brazilian professional footballer who plays as a striker. He is currently a free agent.

While playing for Suwon Samsung Bluewings Johnathan Goaiano was nicknamed "Suwon Ronaldo" for his resemblance to Juventus star player, Cristiano Ronaldo.

Club career
In the 2010-11 season, he was a loaned in Avignon, France. He joined the K-League Challenge side Daegu FC in 2014 and scored 14 goals in 29 matches in the 2014 season to renew his contract with the team. After the end of the 2015 season, he returned to his native country after switching to Sport Recife, but he was moved to Suwon Samsung Bluewings in July 2016.

After scoring in July 2017, he set a new record for scoring 30 goals in the shortest period of time in the history of the Suwon Samsung Bluewings team. It is the shortest time in history among 12 players with more than 30 goals in Suwon Samsung, breaking the previous records set by Sasha and Sandro for a year and two months. Since then, he has scored multiple goals in four consecutive games, scoring nine goals out of 11 goals in recent three games in Suwon, leading the Suwon Samsung Bluewings to second place in league and fifth straight times.

After the 2017 season, he became the K-League Classic's 2017 scoring champion with 22 goals in 26 games, and was included in the K-League's Best 11 awards. After that, Johnathan Goaiano received a generous offer from former South Korean national team coach Uli Stielike, and transferred to Tianjin Teda in China.

Career statistics

Club

Honours

Club
Suwon Samsung Bluewings
 FA Cup (1) : 2016

Individual
 K-League Challenge MVP : 2015
 K-League Challenge score award : 2015
 K-League Challenge Best 11 : 2015
 K-League Classic Best 11 : 2017
 K-League Classic Awards : 2017
 Adidas Pentastic Player : 2017
 K League Top Scorer: 2017

References

External links
 
 Johnathan Goiano at playmakerstats.com (English version of ogol.com.br)
 
 

1990 births
Living people
Brazilian footballers
Brazilian expatriate footballers
Association football forwards
Goiás Esporte Clube players
AC Arlésien players
Central Sport Club players
Daegu FC players
Suwon Samsung Bluewings players
Tianjin Jinmen Tiger F.C. players
Ligue 1 players
K League 2 players
K League 1 players
K League 2 Most Valuable Player Award winners
Chinese Super League players
Expatriate footballers in France
Expatriate footballers in South Korea
Brazilian expatriate sportspeople in South Korea
Expatriate footballers in China
Brazilian expatriate sportspeople in China
Footballers from São Paulo (state)